The Palm Walk is a pedestrian mall located on Arizona State University's Tempe campus that is lined with one hundred and five Mexican fan palms. Running from the foot of the University bridge to the north, to the Student Recreation Complex to the south, the path runs for almost four-tenths of a mile. The path itself follows the old alignment of Normal Avenue, before it was incorporated into the expanding college's campus.

History

Origins
The history of the palm walk dates to an early attempt at campus beautification by Tempe Normal School President Arthur John Matthews. While popularly cited as being planted in 1916, there is no definitive date on when the trees were planted. The best estimates for when the trees were planted vary from 1916 to 1919, although there also exist orders for trees in 1917 and 1918, the latter of which mentions the purchase of palm trees. Originally planted on the northern end of the walk near the original Normal School campus, the trees were later planted to the south, as the college expanded. The last trees were planted in 1930 or the 1930s, depending on sources, and are smaller than the trees on northern portions of the route.

As the Palm Walk runs along the former alignment of Normal Avenue to what would have been the eastern edge of the main campus as it was built, it marked the eastern boundary for campus. As the college expanded over the years, it has become a local landmark for the university.

The University Archives maintains a Web site that displays photos of Palm Walk from the 1930s, 1946, 1957, 1966, and the 1990s.

Online photo controversy
In the fall of 2005, a Hot or Not-style rating site, PalmWalk.com, featured pictures of female students photographed on the campus walkway and asked users to rate their appearance. The site drew the ire of students due to the nature of the work, as pictures were taken of women without their knowledge or consent. While the website's owners hid their identity through the nature of the web domain, they also stated that they respected the rights of the individuals posted, and would remove any photographs upon request. 

Student feedback was quite negative of the site, with The State Press stating that it was not reflective of the university's culture of being known for having attractive women. The site also garnered attention from university officials and police, due to issues with potential copyright violations since the photos were posted without the consent of the university. However, as the website poster was taking the photos in public, there was no violation of privacy since there is no expectation of privacy in a public location. A counter website, Palmshock.com, was eventually formed, which allowed for people to vent their frustrations over the site.

Tree replacement
Since 2013, Arizona State University has published articles stating that the palms of Palm Walk are at the end of their lifespan. According to the university, Mexican fan palms have an estimated lifetime of 100-110 years old, although scientific research has shown that the trees could live as much as five hundred years. As such, the university has drawn up plans to replace the palms with Date palms of an unknown cultivar, in the coming years. These trees would not only provide more shade than the current trees, but they would also allow for harvestable dates, which could then be sold locally. While there is no timeline on replacement of current palms, it is expected that it would be done in the coming decade.

Name
Originally, there was no official name for the Palm Walk, as a 1926 catalog for the school called it College Palms. By 1932, the name was simplified and called The Palms, and the earliest known use of the current name was from a 1967 pamphlet that used palm walk.

References

External links
 A 360° view of the intersection of Palm Walk and Tyler Mall

Arizona State University
Buildings and structures in Tempe, Arizona